1919 in the Philippines details events of note that happened in the Philippines in the year 1919.

Events

May
 May 12-16 – Far Eastern Championship Games is hosted in Manila, Philippines.

September
 September 19 – The silent film Dalagang Bukid by José Nepomuceno is released. It is the first film to be produced locally.

Holidays

As per Act No. 2711 section 29, issued on March 10, 1917, any legal holiday of fixed date falls on Sunday, the next succeeding day shall be observed as legal holiday. Sundays are also considered legal religious holidays.

 January 1 – New Year's Day
 February 22 – Legal Holiday
 April 17 – Maundy Thursday
 April 18 – Good Friday
 May 1 – Labor Day
 May 30 – Legal Holiday
 July 4 – Legal Holiday
 August 13  – Legal Holiday
 November 27 – Thanksgiving Day
 December 25 – Christmas Day
 December 30 – Rizal Day

Births
 August 8 - Ciriaco Cañete, martial artist (d. 2016)

Death
 March 2 - Melchora Aquino, revolutionary, (b. 1812)

References